The 1990–91 NBA season was the Lakers' 43rd season in the National Basketball Association, and 31st in the city of Los Angeles. This season's highlight was Magic Johnson leading the Lakers to the NBA Finals, where they lost in five games to Michael Jordan's Chicago Bulls. The Lakers would not return to the Finals until 2000. The season is generally considered the final season of the team's successful, uptempo Showtime era.

During the off-season, the team signed free agent Sam Perkins, and acquired Terry Teagle from the Golden State Warriors. The Lakers held a 35–11 record at the All-Star break, and finished the regular season with a 58–24 record, but for the first time since the 1980–81 season, did not win their division. Johnson finished second behind Jordan in the voting for the NBA Most Valuable Player Award. Johnson was the league's third-oldest point guard, and had grown more powerful and stronger than in his earlier years, but was also slower and less nimble. Mike Dunleavy was the new head coach, the offense used more half-court sets, and the team had a renewed emphasis on defense.

Johnson averaged 19.4 points, 7.0 rebounds and 12.5 assists per game, and was named to the All-NBA First Team, while James Worthy led the team in scoring averaging 21.4 points per game, and was named to the All-NBA Third Team. Johnson and Worthy were both selected to play in the 1991 NBA All-Star Game in Charlotte. In addition, Byron Scott provided the team with 14.5 points per game, while Perkins contributed 13.5 points and 7.4 rebounds per game, second-year center Vlade Divac provided with 11.2 points, 8.1 rebounds and 1.5 blocks per game, A.C. Green played most of the season off the bench, averaging 9.1 points and 6.3 rebounds per game, and Teagle contributed 9.9 points per game off the bench.

In the Western Conference First Round of the playoffs, the Lakers swept the Houston Rockets in three straight games, then defeated the 7th-seeded Golden State Warriors in five games in the Western Conference Semi-finals. In the Western Conference Finals, they defeated the top-seeded and Pacific Division champion Portland Trail Blazers in six games to advance to the NBA Finals. Following the season, Mychal Thompson retired.

Game 5 of the NBA Finals was the last Finals game played at the Forum. It was also Magic's last NBA game before his retirement that November due to his diagnosis with the HIV virus, although he would play in the All-Star Game in 1992 and the Dream Team that summer. Magic would make a brief return to the Lakers midway through the 1995–96 NBA season. After losing to the Houston Rockets in that year's playoffs, Magic retired again for good.

Draft picks

Roster

Regular season
 April 15, 1991 – Magic Johnson established the standard for most assists in a career with 9,888. The previous record holder was Oscar Robertson. For the season, Magic would establish a team record with 989 assists for the season. Magic would finish the season with a career total of 9,921.

Season standings

y – clinched division title
x – clinched playoff spot

z – clinched division title
y – clinched division title
x – clinched playoff spot

Record vs. opponents

Game log

Regular season

|- style="background:#fcc;"
| 1
| November 3
| @ San Antonio
| L 99-110
| James Worthy (35)
| Sam Perkins (10)
| Magic Johnson (11)
| HemisFair Arena15,908
| 0-1
|- style="background:#fcc;"
| 2
| November 6
| Portland
| L 123-125 (OT)
| James Worthy (26)
| Vlade Divac (13)
| Magic Johnson (22)
| Great Western Forum16,361
| 0-2
|- style="background:#cfc;"
| 3
| November 9
| Sacramento
| W 100-86
| Magic Johnson (25)
| Vlade Divac (16)
| Magic Johnson (13)
| Great Western Forum15,618
| 1-2
|- style="background:#fcc;"
| 4
| November 11
| New York
| L 103-109
| Johnson & Scott (24)
| Magic Johnson (15)
| Magic Johnson (14)
| Great Western Forum17,342
| 1-3
|- style="background:#fcc;"
| 5
| November 13
| Phoenix
| L 111-112
| James Worthy (36)
| Vlade Divac (10)
| Magic Johnson (15)
| Great Western Forum16,512
| 1-4
|- style="background:#cfc;"
| 6
| November 15
| @ Houston
| W 108-103 (OT)
| Sam Perkins (29)
| Magic Johnson (10)
| Magic Johnson (16)
| The Summit16,511
| 2-4
|- style="background:#fcc;"
| 7
| November 16
| @ Dallas
| L 86-99
| Byron Scott (23)
| Magic Johnson (8)
| Magic Johnson (11)
| Reunion Arena17,007
| 2-5
|- style="background:#cfc;"
| 8
| November 18
| Golden State
| W 115-93
| Sam Perkins (22)
| 3 players tied (9)
| Magic Johnson (10)
| Great Western Forum15,644
| 3-5
|- style="background:#cfc;"
| 9
| November 19
| @ Denver
| W 122-105
| James Worthy (25)
| Vlade Divac (11)
| Magic Johnson (11)
| McNichols Sports Arena11,549
| 4-5
|- style="background:#cfc;"
| 10
| November 21
| Denver
| W 141-121
| James Worthy (29)
| Sam Perkins (13)
| Magic Johnson (18)
| Great Western Forum15,941
| 5-5
|- style="background:#cfc;"
| 11
| November 24
| Orlando
| W 115-89
| James Worthy (22)
| A.C. Green (17)
| Magic Johnson (14)
| Great Western Forum16,254
| 6-5
|- style="background:#cfc;"
| 12
| November 28
| San Antonio
| W 97-80
| James Worthy (20)
| James Worthy (11)
| Magic Johnson (12)
| Great Western Forum17,210
| 7-5

|- style="background:#cfc;"
| 13
| December 1
| @ Phoenix
| W 108-98
| Byron Scott (32)
| Magic Johnson (12)
| Magic Johnson (15)
| Arizona Veterans Memorial Coliseum14,487
| 8-5
|- style="background:#cfc;"
| 14
| December 4
| Detroit
| W 114-90
| James Worthy (23)
| Magic Johnson (12)
| Magic Johnson (14)
| Great Western Forum17,505
| 9-5
|- style="background:#cfc;"
| 15
| December 6
| @ Minnesota
| W 83-73
| Magic Johnson (21)
| Vlade Divac (12)
| Magic Johnson (11)
| Target Center19,006
| 10-5
|- style="background:#fcc;"
| 16
| December 7
| @ Utah
| L 79-101
| Magic Johnson (20)
| Johnson & Thompson (9)
| Magic Johnson (9)
| Salt Palace12,616
| 10-6
|- style="background:#cfc;"
| 17
| December 9
| Washington
| W 106-99
| James Worthy (20)
| Sam Perkins (14)
| Magic Johnson (14)
| Great Western Forum15,809
| 11-6
|- style="background:#fcc;"
| 18
| December 12
| Dallas
| L 97-112 (OT)
| James Worthy (28)
| Sam Perkins (11)
| Magic Johnson (12)
| Great Western Forum16,086
| 11-7
|- style="background:#cfc;"
| 19
| December 15
| @ Golden State
| W 111-109
| Sam Perkins (30)
| James Worthy (10)
| Magic Johnson (9)
| Oakland-Alameda County Coliseum Arena15,025
| 12-7
|- style="background:#cfc;"
| 20
| December 16
| Indiana
| W 115-112
| Magic Johnson (29)
| Vlade Divac (8)
| Magic Johnson (21)
| Great Western Forum15,795
| 13-7
|- style="background:#cfc;"
| 21
| December 18
| @ New York
| W 100-97
| Magic Johnson (22)
| 3 players tied (6)
| Magic Johnson (11)
| Madison Square Garden19,081
| 14-7
|- style="background:#fcc;"
| 22
| December 19
| @ Cleveland
| L 74-84
| Magic Johnson (18)
| Sam Perkins (10)
| Magic Johnson (15)
| Richfield Coliseum19,183
| 14-8
|- style="background:#fcc;"
| 23
| December 21
| @ Chicago
| L 103-114
| James Worthy (21)
| Magic Johnson (9)
| Magic Johnson (14)
| Chicago Stadium18,676
| 14-9
|- style="background:#cfc;"
| 24
| December 23
| Minnesota
| W 118-94
| James Worthy (24)
| Vlade Divac (8)
| Magic Johnson (13)
| Great Western Forum17,506
| 15-9
|- style="background:#cfc;"
| 25
| December 26
| @ L.A. Clippers
| W 108-99
| James Worthy (31)
| A.C. Green (16)
| Magic Johnson (13)
| Los Angeles Memorial Sports Arena15,350
| 16-9
|- style="background:#cfc;"
| 26
| December 30
| Philadelphia
| W 115-107
| Magic Johnson (34)
| Magic Johnson (13)
| Magic Johnson (13)
| Great Western Forum17,505
| 17-9

|- style="background:#cfc;"
| 27
| January 3
| @ Portland
| W 108-104
| James Worthy (30)
| Sam Perkins (9)
| Magic Johnson (17)
| Memorial Coliseum<br<12,884
| 18-9
|- style="background:#fcc;"
| 28
| January 4
| @ Golden State
| L 99-115
| Byron Scott (22)
| Vlade Divac (11)
| Magic Johnson (13)
| Oakland-Alameda County Coliseum Arena15,025
| 18-10
|- style="background:#cfc;"
| 29
| January 6
| Golden State
| W 135-108
| James Worthy (29)
| Vlade Divac (12)
| Larry Drew (14)
| Great Western Forum17,197
| 19-10
|- style="background:#fcc;"
| 30
| January 8
| @ Seattle
| L 88-96
| James Worthy (21)
| Divac & Green (6)
| Larry Drew (6)
| Seattle Center Coliseum14,441
| 19-11
|- style="background:#cfc;"
| 31
| January 9
| Utah
| W 108-85
| Byron Scott (20)
| Sam Perkins (10)
| Magic Johnson (15)
| Great Western Forum16,980
| 20-11
|- style="background:#cfc;"
| 32
| January 11
| Cleveland
| W 105-93
| Magic Johnson (27)
| Vlade Divac (11)
| Magic Johnson (14)
| Great Western Forum17,103
| 21-11
|- style="background:#cfc;"
| 33
| January 13
| Houston
| W 116-97
| Vlade Divac (22)
| Vlade Divac (11)
| Magic Johnson (16)
| Great Western Forum17,164
| 22-11
|- style="background:#cfc;"
| 34
| January 15
| Charlotte
| W 128-103
| Terry Teagle (27)
| Vlade Divac (12)
| Magic Johnson (10)
| Great Western Forum16,858
| 23-11
|- style="background:#cfc;"
| 35
| January 17
| @ Sacramento
| W 93-78
| James Worthy (36)
| 3 players tied (9)
| Magic Johnson (15)
| ARCO Arena17,014
| 24-11
|- style="background:#cfc;"
| 36
| January 18
| Seattle
| W 105-96
| Magic Johnson (33)
| Vlade Divac (14)
| Magic Johnson (9)
| Great Western Forum17,505
| 25-11
|- style="background:#cfc;"
| 37
| January 21
| @ Indiana
| W 120-114
| Magic Johnson (27)
| Sam Perkins (12)
| Magic Johnson (15)
| Market Square Arena15,166
| 26-11
|- style="background:#cfc;"
| 38
| January 22
| @ Orlando
| W 116-96
| Byron Scott (32)
| Sam Perkins (9)
| Magic Johnson (8)
| Orlando Arena15,077
| 27-11
|- style="background:#cfc;"
| 39
| January 24
| @ Charlotte
| W 113-93
| James Worthy (24)
| Vlade Divac (9)
| Magic Johnson (17)
| Charlotte Coliseum23,901
| 28-11
|- style="background:#cfc;"
| 40
| January 25
| @ New Jersey
| W 108-103 (OT)
| James Worthy (23)
| Vlade Divac (11)
| Magic Johnson (17)
| Brendan Byrne Arena19,087
| 29-11
|- style="background:#cfc;"
| 41
| January 27
| @ Boston
| W 104-87
| Magic Johnson (22)
| 3 players tied (9)
| Magic Johnson (15)
| Boston Garden14,890
| 30-11
|- style="background:#cfc;"
| 42
| January 29
| New Jersey
| W 110-89
| A.C. Green (19)
| Vlade Divac (11)
| Magic Johnson (7)
| Great Western Forum18,598
| 31-11
|- style="background:#cfc;"
| 43
| January 31
| Atlanta
| W 116-103
| A.C. Green (20)
| A.C. Green (11)
| Magic Johnson (12)
| Great Western Forum17,505
| 32-11

|- style="background:#cfc;"
| 44
| February 1
| @ L.A. Clippers
| W 106-92
| Magic Johnson (30)
| A.C. Green (12)
| Magic Johnson (10)
| Los Angeles Memorial Sports Arena15,350
| 33-11
|- style="background:#cfc;"
| 45
| February 3
| Chicago
| W 99-86
| Byron Scott (18)
| Vlade Divac (13)
| Magic Johnson (11)
| Great Western Forum17,505
| 34-11
|- style="background:#cfc;"
| 46
| February 5
| L.A. Clippers
| W 116-102
| James Worthy (24)
| Vlade Divac (11)
| Magic Johnson (13)
| Great Western Forum17,230
| 35-11
|- align="center"
|colspan="9" bgcolor="#bbcaff"|All-Star Break
|- style="background:#cfc;"
|- bgcolor="#bbffbb"
|- style="background:#fcc;"
| 47
| February 12
| @ Phoenix
| L 95-99
| Sam Perkins (26)
| Divac & Green (9)
| Magic Johnson (15)
| Arizona Veterans Memorial Coliseum14,487
| 35-12
|- style="background:#cfc;"
| 48
| February 13
| Minnesota
| W 120-106
| Terry Teagle (24)
| Vlade Divac (13)
| Magic Johnson (14)
| Great Western Forum16,662
| 36-12
|- style="background:#fcc;"
| 49
| February 15
| Boston
| L 85-98
| James Worthy (23)
| Vlade Divac (11)
| Magic Johnson (16)
| Great Western Forum17,506
| 36-13
|- style="background:#cfc;"
| 50
| February 17
| Portland
| W 106-96
| James Worthy (30)
| Sam Perkins (12)
| Magic Johnson (16)
| Great Western Forum17,505
| 37-13
|- style="background:#cfc;"
| 51
| February 19
| @ Houston
| W 112-103
| James Worthy (27)
| Mychal Thompson (16)
| Magic Johnson (17)
| The Summit16,611
| 38-13
|- style="background:#cfc;"
| 52
| February 21
| @ Dallas
| W 106-92
| Magic Johnson (21)
| Magic Johnson (10)
| Magic Johnson (12)
| Reunion Arena17,007
| 39-13
|- style="background:#fcc;"
| 53
| February 22
| @ Atlanta
| L 102-111
| Magic Johnson (24)
| Magic Johnson (9)
| Magic Johnson (9)
| Omni Coliseum16,311
| 39-14
|- style="background:#cfc;"
| 54
| February 24
| @ Detroit
| W 102-96 (OT)
| Magic Johnson (31)
| A.C. Green (9)
| Magic Johnson (11)
| The Palace of Auburn Hills21,454
| 40-14
|- style="background:#fcc;"
| 55
| February 25
| @ Philadelphia
| L 90-92
| Byron Scott (19)
| Vlade Divac (16)
| Magic Johnson (13)
| The Spectrum18,168
| 40-15
|- style="background:#cfc;"
| 56
| February 28
| @ Denver
| W 121-108
| Terry Teagle (23)
| Vlade Divac (13)
| Magic Johnson (14)
| McNichols Sports Arena13,962
| 41-15

|- style="background:#cfc;"
| 57
| March 1
| Orlando
| W 115-101
| Magic Johnson (26)
| Vlade Divac (12)
| Magic Johnson (9)
| Great Western Forum17,326
| 42-15
|- style="background:#fcc;"
| 58
| March 3
| Houston
| L 95-104
| Vlade Divac (23)
| James Worthy (10)
| Magic Johnson (8)
| Great Western Forum17,505
| 42-16
|- style="background:#fcc;"
| 59
| March 5
| @ Minnesota
| L 85-94
| Magic Johnson (32)
| James Worthy (7)
| Magic Johnson (9)
| Target Center19,006
| 42-17
|- style="background:#fcc;"
| 60
| March 7
| @ Milwaukee
| L 94-99
| James Worthy (26)
| A.C. Green (9)
| Magic Johnson (9)
| Bradley Center18,633
| 42-18
|- style="background:#cfc;"
| 61
| March 9
| @ Washington
| W 87-72
| Magic Johnson (25)
| A.C. Green (11)
| Magic Johnson (8)
| Capital Centre18,758
| 43-18
|- style="background:#cfc;"
| 62
| March 10
| @ Orlando
| W 115-101
| Sam Perkins (20)
| Vlade Divac (15)
| Magic Johnson (12)
| Orlando Arena15,077
| 44-18
|- style="background:#cfc;"
| 63
| March 12
| @ Miami
| W 102-95
| Johnson & Scott (21)
| Magic Johnson (11)
| Magic Johnson (14)
| Miami Arena15,008
| 45-18
|- style="background:#cfc;"
| 64
| March 15
| Denver
| W 127-117
| James Worthy (35)
| Vlade Divac (9)
| Johnson & Worthy (10)
| Great Western Forum17,506
| 46-18
|- style="background:#cfc;"
| 65
| March 17
| San Antonio
| W 98-91
| James Worthy (30)
| James Worthy (9)
| Magic Johnson (15)
| Great Western Forum17,505
| 47-18
|- style="background:#cfc;"
| 66
| March 19
| L.A. Clippers
| W 119-105
| James Worthy (26)
| Vlade Divac (9)
| Magic Johnson (11)
| Great Western Forum17,303
| 48-18
|- style="background:#fcc;"
| 67
| March 20
| @ Seattle
| L 106-114
| James Worthy (23)
| Campbell & Perkins (5)
| James Worthy (7)
| Seattle Center Coliseum14,392
| 48-19
|- style="background:#fcc;"
| 68
| March 22
| Milwaukee
| L 92-99
| James Worthy (34)
| A.C. Green (10)
| Larry Drew (7)
| Great Western Forum17,505
| 48-20
|- style="background:#cfc;"
| 69
| March 24
| Seattle
| W 113-96
| Magic Johnson (33)
| Green & Perkins (9)
| Magic Johnson (11)
| Great Western Forum17,506
| 49-20
|- style="background:#cfc;"
| 70
| March 25
| @ Sacramento
| W 99-89
| James Worthy (26)
| Magic Johnson (12)
| Magic Johnson (14)
| ARCO Arena17,014
| 50-20
|- style="background:#fcc;"
| 71
| March 29
| Portland
| L 105-109 (OT)
| James Worthy (26)
| Magic Johnson (10)
| Magic Johnson (12)
| Great Western Forum17,505
| 50-21
|- style="background:#cfc;"
| 72
| March 31
| Sacramento
| W 115-87
| Terry Teagle (35)
| A.C. Green (10)
| Magic Johnson (10)
| Great Western Forum16,522
| 51-21

|- style="background:#cfc;"
| 73
| April 2
| @ San Antonio
| W 122-105
| Magic Johnson (30)
| Magic Johnson (12)
| Magic Johnson (10)
| HemisFair Arena15,908
| 52-21
|- style="background:#cfc;"
| 74
| April 4
| @ Phoenix
| W 102-98
| James Worthy (26)
| Sam Perkins (13)
| Magic Johnson (14)
| Arizona Veterans Memorial Coliseum14,487
| 53-21
|- style="background:#cfc;"
| 75
| April 5
| Miami
| W 108-87
| Magic Johnson (20)
| Sam Perkins (13)
| Magic Johnson (9)
| Great Western Forum17,505
| 54-21
|- style="background:#cfc;"
| 76
| April 7
| Phoenix
| W 93-85
| Magic Johnson (31)
| Sam Perkins (10)
| Magic Johnson (8)
| Great Western Forum17,505
| 55-21
|- style="background:#cfc;"
| 77
| April 11
| Utah
| W 110-95
| Magic Johnson (31)
| Vlade Divac (12)
| Magic Johnson (11)
| Great Western Forum17,505
| 56-21
|- style="background:#fcc;"
| 78
| April 13
| @ Portland
| L 113-118
| Sam Perkins (32)
| Sam Perkins (10)
| Magic Johnson (15)
| Memorial Coliseum12,884
| 56-22
|- style="background:#cfc;"
| 79
| April 15
| Dallas
| W 112-106
| James Worthy (23)
| Magic Johnson (9)
| Magic Johnson (19)
| Great Western Forum17,505
| 57-22
|- style="background:#fcc;"
| 80
| April 17
| @ Golden State
| L 111-118
| Terry Teagle (21)
| Green & Johnson (8)
| Magic Johnson (15)
| Oakland-Alameda County Coliseum Arena15,025
| 57-23
|- style="background:#fcc;"
| 81
| April 20
| @ Utah
| L 93-107
| Vlade Divac (19)
| Vlade Divac (17)
| Magic Johnson (6)
| Salt Palace12,616
| 57-24
|- style="background:#cfc;"
| 82
| April 21
| Seattle
| W 103-100
| Terry Teagle (19)
| A.C. Green (12)
| Vlade Divac (6)
| Great Western Forum17,505
| 58-24

Playoffs

|- style="background:#cfc;"
| 1
| April 25
| Houston
| W 94–92
| Byron Scott (20)
| Vlade Divac (11)
| Magic Johnson (10)
| Great Western Forum17,505
| 1–0
|- style="background:#cfc;"
| 2
| April 27
| Houston
| W 109–98
| James Worthy (29)
| Vlade Divac (10)
| Magic Johnson (21)
| Great Western Forum17,505
| 2–0
|- style="background:#cfc;"
| 3
| April 30
| @ Houston
| W 94–90
| Magic Johnson (38)
| Sam Perkins (13)
| Magic Johnson (7)
| The Summit16,611
| 3–0
|-

|- style="background:#cfc;"
| 1
| May 5
| Golden State
| W 126–116
| Byron Scott (27)
| Magic Johnson (10)
| Magic Johnson (17)
| Great Western Forum17,505
| 1–0
|- style="background:#fcc;"
| 2
| May 8
| Golden State
| L 124–125
| Magic Johnson (44)
| Magic Johnson (12)
| Magic Johnson (9)
| Great Western Forum17,505
| 1–1
|- style="background:#cfc;"
| 3
| May 10
| @ Golden State
| W 115–112
| James Worthy (36)
| 3 players tied (7)
| Magic Johnson (15)
| Oakland–Alameda County Coliseum Arena15,025
| 2–1
|- style="background:#cfc;"
| 4
| May 12
| @ Golden State
| W 123–107
| Sam Perkins (27)
| Byron Scott (11)
| Magic Johnson (11)
| Oakland–Alameda County Coliseum Arena15,025
| 3–1
|- style="background:#cfc;"
| 5
| May 14
| Golden State
| W 124–119 (OT)
| Magic Johnson (28)
| Sam Perkins (15)
| Magic Johnson (12)
| Great Western Forum17,505
| 4–1
|-

|- style="background:#cfc;"
| 1
| May 18
| @ Portland
| W 111–106
| James Worthy (28)
| Sam Perkins (15)
| Magic Johnson (21)
| Memorial Coliseum12,884
| 1–0
|- style="background:#fcc;"
| 2
| May 21
| @ Portland
| L 98–109
| James Worthy (21)
| Sam Perkins (10)
| Magic Johnson (12)
| Memorial Coliseum12,884
| 1–1
|- style="background:#cfc;"
| 3
| May 24
| Portland
| W 106–92
| James Worthy (25)
| Green & Perkins (9)
| Magic Johnson (19)
| Great Western Forum17,505
| 2–1
|- style="background:#cfc;"
| 4
| May 26
| Portland
| W 116–95
| Magic Johnson (22)
| Magic Johnson (9)
| Magic Johnson (9)
| Great Western Forum17,505
| 3–1
|- style="background:#fcc;"
| 5
| May 28
| @ Portland
| L 84–95
| Magic Johnson (29)
| A.C. Green (9)
| Magic Johnson (7)
| Memorial Coliseum12,884
| 3–2
|- style="background:#cfc;"
| 6
| May 30
| Portland
| W 91–90
| Sam Perkins (26)
| Magic Johnson (11)
| Magic Johnson (8)
| Great Western Forum17,505
| 4–2
|-

|- style="background:#cfc;"
| 1
| June 2
| @ Chicago
| W 93–91
| Perkins & Worthy (22)
| Vlade Divac (14)
| Magic Johnson (11)
| Chicago Stadium18,676
| 1–0
|- style="background:#fcc;"
| 2
| June 5
| @ Chicago
| L 86–107
| James Worthy (24)
| Green & Johnson (7)
| Magic Johnson (10)
| Chicago Stadium18,676
| 1–1
|- style="background:#fcc;"
| 3
| June 7
| Chicago
| L 96–104 (OT)
| Sam Perkins (25)
| Sam Perkins (9)
| Magic Johnson (10)
| Great Western Forum17,506
| 1–2
|- style="background:#fcc;"
| 4
| June 9
| Chicago
| L 82–97
| Vlade Divac (27)
| Vlade Divac (11)
| Magic Johnson (11)
| Great Western Forum17,506
| 1–3
|- style="background:#fcc;"
| 5
| June 12
| Chicago
| L 101–108
| Sam Perkins (22)
| Magic Johnson (11)
| Magic Johnson (20)
| Great Western Forum17,506
| 1–4

Player statistics

NOTE: Please write the players statistics in alphabetical order by last name.

Season

Playoffs

Awards and Records
 Magic Johnson, All-NBA First Team
 James Worthy, All-NBA Third Team

Transactions

References

External links
 Lakers on Database Basketball

Los Angeles Lakers seasons
Western Conference (NBA) championship seasons
Los Angle
Los Angle
Los Angle